Chengguan (or Ching-liang) (738–839) was an important representative of the Huayan school of Chinese Buddhism, under whom the school gained great influence. Chengguan lived through the reigns of nine emperors and was an honored teacher to seven emperors starting with Xuanzong (玄宗) until Wenzong (文宗). The General Survey of Longxing’s Chronology chronicled during Southern Song and A Brief Account of the Five Patriarchs of Fajiezong of Qing recorded a difference of one year in Chengguan’s birth year (737-838 CE or 738-839 CE), but both documented that he lived to be 102. According to the Song Biographies of Preeminent Monks Chengguan had studied the vinaya, the Three Śāstras when they were popular studies in the south and under more than one teacher, perused commentaries such as Awakening Faith in the Mahāyāna (Dacheng Qixin Lun 大乘起信論), studied the Avataṃsaka Sūtra with Indian master Fashen 法詵 (718-778 CE), the Lotus Sūtra and the Vimalakīrti Sūtra and their treatises, the Chan methods of north and south, not to mention the various Chinese philosophical classics, historical works, philology, the Siddham script, Indian philosophies, the four Vedas, the five sciences, mantras, and rituals. This erudite intellectual lectured on the Avataṃsaka Sūtra and its insights, including his various commentaries.

More than a scholar, Chengguan was very much a practitioner. He maintained various self-determined prescripts including always keeping his sash and alms bowl by his side, avoiding looking at women, avoiding visits to laypeople’s homes, never lying down to sleep, abandoning any fame or fortune, regularly reciting The Lotus Sūtra, regularly lecturing the Avataṃsaka Sūtra, regularly studying Mahāyāna texts, and never ceasing to be compassionate in an attempt to help all beings. The Song Biographies of Preeminent Monks and A Brief Account of the Five Patriarchs of Huayan School offer two specific sets of his ten vows that are equal in rigor but with slight variations.

In general, Chengguan was an esteemed monk revered for his commentarial literature authoritative during his time and throughout later generations in East Asia. Chengguan authored at least a dozen commentaries to significant Buddhist texts, the most important of which are the Commentaries to the Avataṃsaka Sūtra (Da Fangguang Fo Huayanjing Shu 大方廣佛華嚴經疏) and The Meanings Proclaimed in the Accompanying Subcommentaries to the Avataṃsaka Sūtra (Da Fangguang Fo Huayanjing Shu Yanyi Chao 大方廣佛華嚴經隨疏演義鈔).  While these treatises are not yet extant in English, Chengguan’s magnum opuses in Chinese are critical contributions to the religio-philosophical history of Huayan and Buddhism in China.

In the eleventh century, Jingyuan 淨源 (1011-1088 CE) became known as the first editor to merge Chengguan’s Commentaries into each line of The Huayanjing, resulting in the publication that is the Exegesis on the Commentaries to the Avataṃsaka Sūtra (Huayanjing Shu Zhu, 華嚴經疏注).  The Subcommentaries remained a separate publication. Preeminent commentators of Yuan and Ming continued to annotate, study, and lecture on Chengguan’s commentaries.  In the Ming Dynasty Miaoming (妙明) compiled Chengguan’s Commentaries and Subcommentaries into one publication for the first time. They did not mesh well, however, because Chengguan’s Outline to the Commentaries to the Avataṃsaka Sūtra (Huayanjing Shu Kewen 華嚴經疏科文)  was still missing. In 1912, laymen Xu Weiru 徐蔚如 (1878-1937 CE) and others edited Chengguan’s Commentaries and Subcommentaries based on a version of the Outline to the Commentaries to the Huayanjing that survived the Chinese persecutions by being in hiding in Japan. Since then, more than 20 editions of compilations combining the Avataṃsaka Sūtra, Chengguan’s Commentaries and Subcommentaries based on his Outline have been disseminated. Different versions of the Chinese Tripiṭaka have selected to include different editions and portions of these compilations.

References

Further reading
 Chengguan; Guo Cheen (2014), Translating totality in parts: Chengguan's commentaries and subcommentaries to the Avatamska Sutra, Lanham: University Press of America
 Girard, F. (2003), Review: Imre Hamar: A Religious Leader in the Tang: Chengguan's Biography, Bulletin de l'École française d'Extrême-Orient, 90 (1), 552-556 
 Hamar, Imre (2002). A Religious Leader in the Tang: Chengguan’s Biography, Tokyo: The International Institute of Buddhist Studies, 
 Hamar, Imre (1999). Buddhism and The Dao in Tang China:  The Impact of Confucianism and Daoism on the Philosophy of Chengguan. Acta Orientalia Hung. 52, (3-4), pp. 283–292

External links
 Articles by Imre Hamar
 English Translation of Chengguan's Preface to the Commentaries to the Avataṃsaka Sūtra
 Chengguan's Commentaries to the Avataṃsaka Sūtra in Chinese
 Chengguan's Subcommentaries to the Avataṃsaka Sūtra in Chinese

Tang dynasty Buddhist monks
Huayan Buddhists
738 births
839 deaths